Engaged & Underage is an American reality television series that aired on MTV. The series follows couples, that have at least one partner between the ages of 18 and 20, in the final weeks leading to their wedding. The series debuted on January 22, 2007 to 1.7 million viewers.

Episodes

Season 1

Season 2

Specials

External links
 Official site

References

2000s American reality television series
2007 American television series debuts
2008 American television series endings
MTV reality television series
Wedding television shows